Platinum Partners was an Indian corporate law firm founded on 1 May 2008. It had offices in Mumbai, New Delhi and Bangalore It had around 45 lawyers who are based across the three offices before the break up. The firm was later separated along geographical lines, with the Mumbai and Delhi office each rebranding from 1 November 2020 under new banners.

The Delhi and Bengaluru offices are headed up by partner Karam Daulet-Singh and have around 5 partners, who make up around 30 fee-earners. Of those, one partner and 5 fee-earners are based in a Bengaluru office. This partnership is called Touchstone Partners, and it is starting a new Mumbai office by hiring [[Nishith Desai Associates (NDA) leader Ruchir Sinha as a partner. Ruchir Sinha quit the firm in February 2022 to setup Resolut Partners, and the entire Mumbai office of Touchstone Partners moved out to join Resolut Partners.

The Mumbai office of Platinum Partners, which was headed up by partner Ankit Majmudar, has up to 30 fee-earners, including around 6 partners. This Mumbai partnership under Majmudar is now rebrand as Quillon Partners.

Areas of Practice

The firm specialised in mergers & acquisitions, private equity & venture capital, fund formation, projects & infrastructure, securities law including delistings, competition/antitrust, employment laws and investigations and advises many large international and domestic clients. However, in February 2021 after Ruchir Sinha quit, the firm shut down their fund formation practice.

Notable Deals

Platinum Partners has advised on notable transactions, including:

Hewlett Packard Enterprise Company on the sale of a majority stake in the equity share capital of Mphasis Limited, an Indian listed company, to the Blackstone Group.
British drinks giant Diageo on its acquisition of Vijay Mallya-promoted United Spirits Limited.
Novartis AG in connection with the Indian legal and regulatory aspects of its acquisitions and sale of businesses, namely, the sale by Novartis of its vaccines business to GlaxoSmithKline plc, the sale by GlaxoSmithKline plc of its oncology business to Novartis and the creation of a joint venture between GSK and Novartis for the consumer health business.
Danone in connection with its acquisition of the nutrition business of Wockhardt Group, an Indian pharmaceutical major, for a reported consideration of about €250 million.
Private equity investor Blackstone in connection with acquisition of a part of the business processing outsourcing business of Serco Group plc, a UK listed company.
Essar on the sale of its BPO subsidiary Aegis to Capital Square Partners.
Germany-based Boehringer Ingelheim on getting Competition Commission of India (CCI) approval for its $25bn asset swap deal with Sanofi.

Rankings & Awards

The Firm
Band 2 in Corporate/M&A, Band 2 in Private Equity, and Band 4 in Competition / Antitrust by Chambers and Partners.
Band 2 in Corporate & Commercial and Projects by Chamber Practice.
Rank 16 in Q1 2017 M&A league tables by Mergermarket. 
Ranked by IFLR in the M&A, Private Equity and Infrastructure practice areas.
Rank 16 in Top Indian Law Firms by RSG Consulting.

Individual Lawyers
Karam Daulet-Singh – Band 1 in Corporate/M&A and Band 4 in Projects by Chambers & Partners.
Ankit Majmudar – Band 1 in Corporate/ M&A and Band 1 in Private Equity by Chambers & Partners; 'Rising Stars' by RSG Consulting.
Anuj Bhatia – Band 4 in Corporate/M&A by Chambers & Partners.
Gautam Bhat – 'Rising Stars' by RSG Consulting.
Yashasvi Mohanram – 'Up and Coming' in Corporate/M&A by Chambers & Partners.
Gaurav Desai – 'Up and Coming' in Corporate/M&A by Chambers & Partners.

References

Law firms of India